Peter Beaumont may refer to:

 Peter Beaumont (archaeologist) (1935–2016), South African archaeologist
 Peter Beaumont (figure skater) (born 2001), ice dancer
 Peter Beaumont (journalist) (born 1961), British journalist
 Peter Beaumont (judge) (born 1944), British judge
 Peter Beaumont (racehorse trainer) (1934–2020), British racehorse trainer
 Peter Beaumont (rower) (born 1965), British Olympic rower

See also
Pete de Beaumont (1915–2010), American mechanical engineer